Austin Stogner is an American college football tight end for the South Carolina Gamecocks of the Southeastern Conference (SEC). He previously played for the Oklahoma Sooners.

Early years
Stogner grew up in Plano, Texas and attended Prestonwood Christian Academy. As a senior, he had 50 receptions for 691 yards and six touchdowns and played in the 2018 All-American Bowl. Stogner was rated a four star recruit and committed to play college football at Oklahoma over offers from Nebraska, LSU and Ohio State.

College career
Stogner played in all 14 of Oklahoma's games as a true freshman and caught seven passes for 66 yards and two touchdowns. He became the team's starting H-Back going into his sophomore season. Stogner finished the season with 26 receptions for 422 yards and three touchdowns while missing the final three regular season games due to a knee injury that required surgery and was named second team All-Big 12 Conference by the Associated Press. Following surgery, he contracted a staph infection and lost 35 pounds. As a junior, Stogner played in nine games and caught 14 passes for 166 yards and three touchdowns. Following the end of the regular season and the departure of Oklahoma head coach Lincoln Riley, Stogner entered the NCAA transfer portal.

On December 13, 2021, Stogner announced that he would be transferring to the University of South Carolina alongside former Oklahoma quarterback Spencer Rattler.

On December 8, 2022, Stogner announced on social media that he would be transferring back to the University of Oklahoma as a graduate transfer to play out his final year of eligibility with the Sooners.

References

External links
Oklahoma Sooners bio
South Carolina Gamecocks bio

Living people
American football tight ends
Oklahoma Sooners football players
Players of American football from Texas
Sportspeople from Plano, Texas
2000 births
South Carolina Gamecocks football players